

Events
January 9 – The elderly Carl Philipp Emanuel Bach reviews Johann Nikolaus Forkel's book Allgemeine Geschichte der Musik in the Hamburgischer unpartheyischer Correspondent.
January 22 – Composer Ignaz Pleyel marries Franziska Gabrielle Ignatia Lefebvre, daughter of a tapestry maker.
January 26 – Australia Day:  leads the First Fleet into landing at Sydney Cove (which will become Sydney) to begin the settlement of Australia; it carries Surgeon George Worgan's London-made square piano which will remain in the country and be donated to the Western Australian Academy of Performing Arts collection in 2016.
February 6 – The Kärntnertortheater in Vienna closes, after the German Opera Company disbands.
February 12 – Antonio Salieri is appointed Imperial Royal Kapellmeister by Emperor Joseph II of Austria, in succession to Giuseppe Bonno, who is forcibly retired.
March 6 – Domenico Cimarosa, recently invited to St Petersburg by the Empress Catherine II of Russia, premières his La felicità inaspetata, which fails to impress his new patron.
June 25 – Publication of three string quintets (K.406, 515, 516) by Wolfgang Amadeus Mozart is postponed for a year because of a lack of take-up of subscriptions.
July 17 – Carl Ditters von Dittersdorf is officially dismissed from his post as Amtshauptmann of Freiwaldau, but actually continues in the position for another seven years.
November 25 – Three weeks before his death, Carl Philipp Emanuel Bach writes his last known letter, to Johann Jacob Heinrich Westphal.

Opera
Giuseppe Cambini – Le bon pére 
Thomas Carter – The Constant Maid, or Poll of Plympton
Luigi Cherubini – Ifigenia in Aulide
Domenico Cimarosa 
La felicità inaspettata
La vergine del sole
Franz Danzi – Die Mitternachtsstunde
Giovanni Paisiello 
L'Amor Contrastato
Fedra, premiered Jan. 1 in Naples
Antonio Sacchini – Arvire et Évélina (posthumous "tragédie lyrique", finished by Jean-Baptiste Rey), premiered April 29.
Antonio Salieri 
Axur, Re d'Ormus (libretto by Lorenzo Da Ponte after Beaumarchais)
Il Talismano (libretto by Lorenzo Da Ponte after Goldoni)
Joseph Weigl – Il pazzo per forza

Classical music
William Billings – The Singing Master’s Assistant (including "Vermont" and "Washington")
Henry Bishop – Six New Minuets and Twelve Country Dances (including "Knoll Park")
Domenico Cimarosa – Atene edificata (cantata)
Muzio Clementi 
3 Piano Trios, Op.21
3 Piano Trios, Op.22
Keyboard sonata op.24/1
Michel Corrette – Messe pour le tems de Noël
Carl Ditters von Dittersdorf – 6 String Quartets
Jan Ladislav Dussek 
3 Sonatas for Keyboard with Violin, Op.5
Three piano sonatas C.41–43
Joseph-Francois Garnier – Simphonie Concertante for 2 Oboes
Joseph Haydn 
8 Nocturnes, Hob.II:25–32
String Quartet in C major, Hob.III:57
String Quartet in G major, Hob.III:58
String Quartet in E major, Hob.III:59
String Quartet in A major, Hob.III:60
String Quartet in F minor, Hob.III:61
String Quartet in B-flat major, Hob.III:62
Baryton Trio in A major, Hob.XI:6
Baryton Trio in A major, Hob.XI:8
Symphony No.90 in C major, Hob.I:90
Symphony No.91 in E-flat major, Hob.I:91
Michael Haydn 
Die Ährenleserin (singspiel)
Symphony No.37 in D major, MH 476
Pelham Humfrey – O Lord, My God
Frantisek Kotzwara – The Battle of Prague (piano with commentary)
Leopold Kozeluch – Piano Sonata, Op.26 No.3
Anton Kraft – 3 Cello Sonatas, Op. 1
Rodolphe Kreutzer – Violin Concerto No.6 in E minor
Jean-Baptiste Krumpholz – 6 Harp Sonatas, Opp. 13–14
Vicente Martín y Soler – 12 Canzonette Italiane
Wolfgang Amadeus Mozart 
6 German Dances, K.536
Ein deutsches Kriegslied, K.539
Adagio in B minor, K.540 (dated March 19)
Un bacio di mano, K.541 (dated May)
Piano Trio in E major, K.542
Symphony No. 39 in E flat major, K.543
Piano Trio in C major, K.548
Più non si trovano, K.549
Symphony No. 40 in G minor, K. 550
Symphony No. 41 in C major, K.551, "Jupiter"
Canon for 3 Voices in A major (Caro bell'idol mio), K.562
Divertimento in E-flat major, K.563
Piano Trio in G major, K.564
6 German Dances, K.567
12 Minuets, K.568
Giovanni Paisiello – Duet for two violins
Ignaz Pleyel 
Violin Concerto in D major, B.103A
3 Quintets, B.280–282
6 Keyboard Trios, B.431–436
Alexander Reinagle – Federal March
Giuseppe Sarti – 3 Sonatas for Keyboard and Violin, Op. 4
Giovanni Battista Viotti 
Violin Concerto No.13 in A major
Violin Concerto No.14 in A minor
6 Violin Sonatas, W 5.1–6 (Op. 4)

Methods and theory writings 

 Johann Nikolaus Forkel – Allgemeine Geschichte der Musik
 Ferdinand Kauer – Kurzgefaßte Anweisung das Violoncell zu spielen
 Vincenzo Manfredini – Difesa della musica moderna e de' suoi celebri esecutori
 Ernst Wilhelm Wolf – Musikalischer Unterricht

Births
January 5 – Caspar Ett, composer and musician (died 1847)
January 8 
Erzherzog Rudolph, composer and archduke (died 1831)
Duke Eugen of Württemberg, composer and general (died 1857)
January 22 – George Gordon Byron, lyricist and poet (died 1824)
January 31 – Felice Romani, librettist and writer (died 1865)
February 10 – Johann Peter Pixis, composer (died 1874)
March 10 – Joseph von Eichendorff, lyricist and poet (died 1857)
May 16 – Friedrich Rückert, librettist and poet (died 1866)
August 20 – José Bernardo Alcedo, composer (died 1878)
August 26 – Aloys Schmitt, composer (died 1866)
September 5 – George Macfarren, lyricist (died 1843)
September 28 – Karl Christian Philipp Reichel composer (died 1857)
October 11 – Simon Sechter, composer (died 1867)
October 20 – Philip Knapton, composer (died 1833) 
November 6 – Giuseppe Donizetti, composer (died 1856)
November 11 – Michał Wielhorski, Russian composer (died 1856)
December 18 –  Camille Pleyel, musician (died 1855)
December 21 – Charles Chaulieu Sr., composer (died 1849)
December 26 – Carl Anton Philipp Braun, composer (died 1835)
date unknown  
Brita Catharina Lidbeck, Swedish concert singer and member of the Royal Swedish Academy of Music (died 1864)
John David Loder, composer and violinist (died 1846)

Deaths
January 15 – Gaetano Latilla, composer (b. 1711)
March 2 – Salomon Gessner, lyricist and poet (born 1730)
March 29 – Charles Wesley, hymn-writer (b. 1707)
April 12 
Carlo Antonio Campioni, composer (b. 1720)
Carl Joseph Toeschi, composer (born 1731)
April 15 – Giuseppe Bonno, composer (b. 1711)
May 17 – Dorothea Biehl, librettist (born 1731)
June 28 – Johann Christoph Vogel, composer
July 14 – Johann Gottfried Müthel, composer (b. 1728)
November 2 – Johann Samuel Schröter, German composer (born 1753)
December 14 – Carl Philipp Emmanuel Bach, composer (b. 1714)
December 12 – Joseph Gibbs, composer (b. 1699)

References

 
18th century in music
Music by year